The canton of Sully-sur-Loire is an administrative division of the Loiret department, central France. Its borders were modified at the French canton reorganisation which came into effect in March 2015. Its seat is in Sully-sur-Loire.

It consists of the following communes:
 
Bonnée
Les Bordes
Bray-Saint Aignan
Cerdon
Coullons
Dampierre-en-Burly
Germigny-des-Prés
Guilly
Isdes
Lion-en-Sullias
Neuvy-en-Sullias
Ouzouer-sur-Loire
Poilly-lez-Gien
Saint-Aignan-le-Jaillard
Saint-Benoît-sur-Loire
Saint-Brisson-sur-Loire
Saint-Florent
Saint-Gondon
Saint-Martin-sur-Ocre
Saint-Père-sur-Loire
Sully-sur-Loire
Viglain
Villemurlin

References

Cantons of Loiret